Lohara Tehsil is a tehsil/taluka (subdistrict) in  Osmanabad district, Maharashtra on the Deccan Plateau of India. Lohara Bk. is the administrative headquarters of the tehsil.  There are forty-seven villages in Lohara Taluka.

Demographics
In the 2001 Indian census, Lohara Tahsil recorded 110,163 inhabitants of which 56,629 (51.4%) were male and 53,534 (48.6%) were female, for a gender ratio of 945 females per thousand males. 

In the 2011 census, Lohara Tahsil had 116,913 inhabitants and a gender ratio of 930 females per thousand males. The tahsil was 100% rural. The literacy rate in 2011 was 74.83% overall in Lohara Tahsil, with a rate of 83.84% for males and 65.22% for females. In 2011 in Lohara Tahsil, 11.26% of the population was 0 to 6 years of age.

List of villages 
	Achaler
	Arni
	Ashta kasar
	Belwadi
	Bendkal
	Bhatangali
	Bhosga
	Chincholi kate
	Chincholi rebe
	Dastapur
	Dhanori
	Ekondi lohara
	Harali
	Hipparga sayyad
	Hippargarava
	Holi
	Jewali
	Kamalpur
	Kanegaon
	Karanjgaon
	Karwanji
	Kasti Bk.
	Kasti Kh.
	Khed
	Kolnur pandari
	Kondjigad
	Lohara Bk.
	Lohara Kh.
	Makani
	Malegaon
	Mardi
	Mogha bk.
	Mogha kh.
	Murshadpur
	Nagral
	Nagur
	Phanepur
	Rajegaon
	Salegaon
	Sastur
	Tawshigad
	Toramba
	Udatpur
	Undargaon
	Vilaspur pandhari
	Wadgaon
	Wadgaonwadi

See also 
Achaler

References 

Osmanabad district
Talukas in Maharashtra